Bambio is a sub-prefecture and town in the Sangha-Mbaéré Prefecture of the south-west Central African Republic.

Sub-prefectures of the Central African Republic
Populated places in Sangha-Mbaéré